A foreign national wishing to enter Papua New Guinea must obtain a visa in one of the PNG diplomatic missions, unless they are a citizen of one of the countries eligible for visa on arrival or eVisa. All visitors must hold a passport valid for 6 months.

Visa policy map

Visa on arrival
Nationals of the following 71 countries and territories may obtain a free visa valid for 60 days (extension is possible for a fee)  on arrival at Port Moresby or Tokua (Rabaul):

1 – Also applicable to passports issued to residents of French and Dutch territories in the Caribbean.
2 – 30 days, also available at Gurney Airport (Alotau) and Mount Hagen Airport.
3 – Also applicable to passports issued to residents of Cook Islands, Niue and Tokelau.
4 – Also applicable to passports issued to residents of Guam, Northern Mariana Islands, Puerto Rico and Virgin Islands.

Visa on arrival can also be obtained by citizens of China who are diplomatic, service, and passport for public affairs holders and ordinary passport holders travelling under organized tour groups sanctioned by the Tourism Promotion Authority.

History 
The visa on arrival policy was suspended from 30 October to 1 December 2018 due to the APEC Papua New Guinea 2018 summit.

In June 2019 it was announced that 20 additional countries from APEC region would become eligible for eVisa.

Australian passport holders are not eligible for visa on arrival for business visits.

eVisa
As of November 2018 nationals of all countries eligible for visa on arrival can also obtain an eVisa valid for 60 days. eVisa valid for 30 days is also available to nationals of the following 25 countries:

APEC Business Travel Card
Holders of passports issued by the following countries who possess an APEC Business Travel Card (ABTC) containing the "PNG" code on the reverse that it is valid for travel to Papua New Guinea can enter visa-free for business trips for up to 60 days.

ABTCs are issued to nationals of:

Statistics

Most visitors arriving to Papua New Guinea were from the following countries of nationality:

See also

Visa requirements for Papua New Guinean citizens
Foreign relations of Papua New Guinea

References

External links
Papua New Guinea Immigration & Citizenship Service Authority

Papua New Guinea
Foreign relations of Papua New Guinea